VistaVision is a higher resolution, widescreen variant of the 35 mm motion picture film format which was created by engineers at Paramount Pictures in 1954.

Paramount never used anamorphic processes such as 2.55: 1, CinemaScope but refined the quality of its flat widescreen system by orienting the 35 mm negative horizontally in the camera gate and shooting onto a big area, which yielded the finer-grained projection print.

As finer-grained film stocks appeared on the market, VistaVision became obsolete. Paramount dropped the format just after seven years, although for 40 more years the format was used by some European and Japanese producers for movies, and by USA movies such as the first three Star Wars films for high-resolution special effects sequences.

In many ways, VistaVision became the testing ground for every cinematography idea that evolved into 70 mm IMAX and OMNIMAX film formats in the 1970s. Both IMAX and OMNIMAX are oriented sideways, like VistaVision.

History
As a response to an industry recession brought about by the popularity of television, the Hollywood studios turned to large format movies in order to regain audience attendance. The first of these, Cinerama, debuted in September 1952, and consisted of three strips of 35 mm film projected side-by-side onto a giant, curved screen, augmented by seven channels of stereophonic sound.

Five months later, in February 1953, Twentieth Century Fox announced that they would soon be introducing a simpler version of Cinerama using anamorphic lenses instead of multiple film strips; a widescreen process that soon became known to the public as CinemaScope.

As a response, Paramount Pictures devised its own system the following month to augment its 3-D process known as Paravision. This process utilized a screen size that yielded an aspect ratio of 5 units wide by 3 units high, or 1.66:1. By using a different sized aperture plate and wider lens, a normal Academy ratio film could be soft matted to this or any other aspect ratio. Shortly thereafter, it was announced that all of the studio's productions would be shot in this ratio.

The VistaVision fanfare, used on most of the films produced in this ratio, was written by film, television, and radio composer and orchestrator Nathan Van Cleave.

This "flat" widescreen process was adopted by other studios and by the end of 1953, more than half of the theaters in America had installed wide screens. However, there were drawbacks: because a smaller portion of the image was being used and magnification was increased, excessive grain and soft images plagued early widescreen presentations. Some studios sought to compensate for this by shooting its color pictures with a full aperture gate (rather than the academy aperture), and then reducing the image in Technicolor's optical printer. This process is a predecessor of today's Super 35 format which also uses a 1.85:1 ratio, but uses one-third more frame area than a standard 1.85:1 matted into a 4:3.

Paramount took this concept a step further, using old Stein cameras from the 1930s which used a two-frame color format that was itself adopted from a 1902 three-frame color film process developed by Edward Raymond Turner. For the aborted early 1930s color process, instead of an image four perforations high, the camera exposed eight perforations (essentially two frames) consisting of one 4-perf image through a red filter and one 4-perf image through a green filter.

In shooting VistaVision, the film was run horizontally rather than vertically, and instead of exposing two simultaneous 4-perf frames, the entire eight perforations were used for one image. This format is identical to the 135 film format used by 35 mm still cameras.

Because of its peculiar horizontal orientation on the negative, VistaVision was sometimes called Lazy 8 by film professionals. This gave a wider aspect ratio of 1.5:1 versus the conventional 1.37:1 Academy ratio, and a much larger image area. In order to satisfy all theaters with all screen sizes, VistaVision films were shot in such a way that they could be shown in one of three recommended aspect ratios: 1.66:1, 1.85:1 and 2.00:1.

The negative was "scribed" with a new form of cue mark, made at the start of each 2000-foot (610 m) reel. Similar in shape to an F, the cue mark contained staffs that directed the projectionist to the top of the frame for the three recommended aspect ratios. The projectionist racked their framing so that the staff touched the top of the screen (at the appropriate ratio) and the framing was set for the rest of the reel. On many home video releases these cue marks have been digitally erased.

While most competing widescreen film systems used magnetic audio and true stereophonic sound, early VistaVision carried only Perspecta Stereo, encoded in the optical track.

Loren L. Ryder, chief engineer at Paramount, expressed four general reasons he thought Paramount's VistaVision would be the forerunner of widescreen projection in most theaters:
 VistaVision could be shown at widescreen aspect ratios between 1.66 and 2.00:1.
 VistaVision could be (and most often was) further printed down to standard vertical 35 mm reels keeping its 1.66:1 widescreen aspect ratio, which meant exhibitors did not need to purchase additional projection equipment, unlike CinemaScope.
 VistaVision did not cut down the number of seats in any theater (as did Cinerama, and CinemaScope at first).
 VistaVision allowed patrons to see more and therefore gain more enjoyment out of a feature.

After months of trade screenings, Paramount introduced VistaVision to the public at Radio City Music Hall on October 14, 1954, with its first film shot in the process, White Christmas.

White Christmas, Strategic Air Command, To Catch a Thief, Richard III, and The Battle of the River Plate had very limited (two or three) prints struck in the 8-perf VistaVision format in which they were shot. Although the clarity of these 8-perf prints was striking, they were used only for premiere or preview engagements between 1954 and 1956 and required special projection equipment. This exhibition process was impractical because for the footage to travel through a projector at the normal 24 frames per second, the film had to roll at three feet per second, double the speed of 35 mm film and causing many technical and mechanical problems. Aside from these prints all other VistaVision films were shown in the conventional 4-perf (vertical) format, as planned.

Alfred Hitchcock used VistaVision for many of his films in the 1950s. However, by the late 1950s with the introduction of finer-grained color stocks and the disadvantage of shooting twice as much negative stock, VistaVision became obsolete. Less expensive anamorphic systems such as CinemaScope and the more expensive 70 mm format became standard during the later 1950s and 1960s.

Since the last American VistaVision picture, One-Eyed Jacks in 1961, the format has not been used as a primary imaging system for American feature films. However, VistaVision's high resolution made it attractive for some special effects work within some later feature films. Many VistaVision cameras were sold off internationally beginning in the early 1960s, which led to a significant number of VistaVision format productions (which did not use the trade name) in countries such as Italy and Japan from the 1960s to 1980s. The format was used infrequently for lesser-known Japanese films until at least 2000.

Special effects usage

In 1975, a small group of artists and technicians (including Richard Edlund who was to receive two Academy Awards for his work) revived the long-dormant format to create the special effects shots for George Lucas's space epic Star Wars. A retooled VistaVision camera dubbed the Dykstraflex (named for special effects master John Dykstra) was used by the group (later called Industrial Light & Magic) in complex process shots. For more than two decades after this, VistaVision was often used as an originating and intermediate format for shooting special effects since a larger negative area compensates against the increased grain created when shots are optically composited. By the early 21st century, computer-generated imagery, advanced film scanning, digital intermediate methods and film stocks with higher resolutions optimized for special effects work had together rendered VistaVision mostly obsolete even for special effects work. Nevertheless, in 2008, ILM was still using the format in some production steps, such as for Indiana Jones and the Kingdom of the Crystal Skull, and a VistaVision camera was used in the semi-trailer flip scene in The Dark Knight when there were not enough IMAX cameras to cover all the angles needed for the shot. More recently, certain key sequences of the film Inception were shot in VistaVision, and in the film Scott Pilgrim vs. the World, shots that needed to be optically enlarged were shot in VistaVision.

Technical specifications
VistaVision (8/35)
 spherical lenses, usually adapted and re-mounted Leica full-frame Rangefinder™ camera lenses; SOM Berthiot made a special zoom just for VistaVision applications, but it saw very little use.
 8 perforations per frame.
 horizontal pulldown, from right to left (viewed from emulsion side).
 slightly less depth of field than vertical pulldown 35 mm.
 camera aperture: 1.485 inches (37.72 mm) by 0.981 inches (24.92 mm).

Films shot in VistaVision

White Christmas was the first Paramount film to utilize the VistaVision method, but perhaps the most well-known film to be shot completely on VistaVision is Alfred Hitchcock's Vertigo.

Legacy
The camera numbered VistaVision #1, used on Cecil B. DeMille's The Ten Commandments, films by Alfred Hitchcock, and others, was offered at auction on September 30, 2015, by Profiles in History with an estimated value of US$30,000 to $50,000, with a winning bid of US$65,000.

Also offered at the same auction was VistaVision High Speed #1 (VVHS1), which was used to film the parting of the Red Sea in The Ten Commandments (1956) and special effects on Star Wars (winning bid US$60,000.)

RED Monstro sensor is a revamp of the VistaVision sensor. Cameras with the sensor are Red Ranger Monstro, DSMC2 Monstro, and Panavision DXL2.

See also
 Technirama
 List of film formats
 List of VistaVision films

References

Further reading
 "The Story of VistaVision" by Keith Wilson, Cinema Retro, Vol. 11, Issue 31, 2015 (on US newsstands Feb 2015), pages 40–41. Large format magazine article with nine photos, including technical.

External links
 List of VistaVision titles at the Internet Movie Database
 Widescreen Museum — The VistaVision Wing
 Chasing Cotards Short film shot in VistaVision. Premiered May 8, 2010 at London IMAX

Motion picture film formats
Paramount Pictures